The 1966 All-Ireland Under-21 Football Championship was the third staging of the All-Ireland Under-21 Football Championship since its establishment by the Gaelic Athletic Association in 1964.

Kildare entered the championship as the defending champions.

On 2 October 1966, Roscommon won the championship following a 2–10 to 1–12 defeat of Kildare in the All-Ireland final. This was their first All-Ireland title.

Results

All-Ireland Under-21 Football Championship

Semi-finals

Final

Statistics

Miscellaneous

 Roscommon win the Connacht title for the first time in their history.

References

1966
All-Ireland Under-21 Football Championship